Palaeocarassius  is an extinct genus of Miocene-aged cyprinid fish closely related to the crucian carps of Carassius.  Most fossils are of otoliths, teeth, fin spines, and scales found in Miocene-aged lacustrine strata throughout Europe, though, two species, P. basalticus and P. priscus (syn. Cyprinus priscus), are also known from whole body fossils, representing stout-bodied, large-headed animals that bear strong resemblances to the living crucian carps.  The holotype of the type species, P. mydlovariensis, is a disarticulated head.

Species
 Palaeocarassius mydlovariensis Obrhelová, 1970 (type species)
 Palaeocarassius basalticus Gaudant, 1997 (French species)
 Palaeocarassius obesus
 Palaeocarassius priscus (H. von Meyer, 1852) (syn. Cyprinus priscus)

References

Cyprininae
Miocene fishes of Europe
Prehistoric fish genera